Gangaraju (born June 23, 1951), professionally known as Hamsalekha, is an Indian film composer and a songwriter who works in South Indian cinema, predominantly in the Kannada film industry since the late 1980s. He is also a screenplay writer, dialogue writer, instrumentalist and a conductor, composed and written for over 500 music albums. 

Hamsalekha has won one National Film Awards and six Filmfare Awards in the Best Music Director Category; seven Karnataka State Film Awards - four for music direction and three for lyrics - and is a recipient of an honorary doctorate from Bangalore University.

Early career
Hamsalekha was born as Gangaraju in 1951, to K. H. Govindaraju and Rajamma in Tulasikatte, near Akkipete in Bangalore. After his studies, he was employed in his father's printing press and subsequently joined his brother Balakrishna's orchestra group. Lavani Neelakantappa his teacher modified his name as "Hamsalekha".  He was introduced into feature films by director M. N. Prasad, who provided an opportunity to write a song for the film Triveni (1973).The song "Neena Bhagavantha" was his first release picturised on actor Udaykumar.  His debut film as a musician was the 1981 unreleased film Rahuchandra. Officially, his cinema career started as a dialogue and lyric writer for the film Naanu Nanna Hendthi (1985). Later his popularity peaked only after his association with actor-director Ravichandran. Premaloka, released in 1987.

Personal life
Hamsalekha is married to Latha Hamsalekha who was a playback singer in the 1990s. The couple have a son named Alankar and two daughters named Tejaswini and Nandini. Alankar is associated with films as an actor and musician. Few of his released and unreleased movies are Sugghi, Tapori and Roja. Tejaswini is associated with film direction, acting and directing plays, she has done her master's in theater from Bangalore University and directed many plays in association with her father Hamsalekha. Nandini began her playback singing career with the film Sixer (2006).

Notable works
After working on Premaloka, Hamsalekha became one of the most prolific music directors in Kannada film, with many hits. He made occasional use of many genres of music, including Western, pop, rock, hip hop, Indian classical, folk, ghazals, Sufi, and item songs. "Chandakinta Chanda", a ghazal he composed for the film Sparsha, was a major hit. He has created songs ranging from the philosophical ("Le Le Marula" in Shaapa, a film whose story he wrote himself) to the naughty ("Kaayi Kaayi Nuggekaayi Mahimege" in Halli Maestru), the patriotic ("Huttidhare Kannada Nadalli Hutta Bekku" in Rajkumar's Aakasmika, a song which has become an unofficial anthem of Karnataka) and love songs ("Ele Hombisile..." in Halunda Tavaru). He composed the background score for one movie using a single instrument and made the music for Kona Eedaite with no instruments at all. His music in the film Hagalu Vesha had a rustic and folk feel without the use of synthetic sounds. Shanthi, a film by Baraguru Ramachandrappa with music by Hamsalekha, was mentioned in the Guinness Book of Records as the film with only one character.  He made his an onscreen appearance in Mukhaputa. His music in the 2010 movie Naanu Nanna Kanasu was appreciated by critics as well as audiences. He also composed for the National Award-winning movie Puttakkana Highway in 2011.

The melodic structure of his songs demand considerable vocal virtuosity, and have found expressive platform amongst some of India's respected vocalists and playback singers, such as Dr. Rajkumar, P. B. Sreenivas, S. Janaki, Vani Jairam, P. Susheela, K. J. Yesudas, S. P. Balasubrahmanyam, Mano, Swarnalatha, K. S. Chithra, Kavita Krishnamurthy, Anuradha Paudwal, Sadhana Sargam, B. R. Chaya, Manjula Gururaj, Chandrika Gururaj, L. N. Shastry, Rajesh Krishnan, Ramesh Chandra, Hemanth Kumar, Sangeetha Katti, Rathnamala Prakash, Nanditha, Sowmya Raoh, B. Jayashree, Sonu Nigam, Hariharan, Udit Narayan, Kumar Sanu and Shreya Ghoshal with majority of the songs recorded by S. P. Balasubrahmanyam, S. Janaki and K. S. Chithra. He recorded some of the rare and distinct voices like M. Balamuralikrishna for a song in Muthina Haara (1990), C. Ashwath for Hoovu Hannu (1993) and Pankaj Udhas for Sparsha (2001).

Non-film music
Hamsalekha has written music for stage plays and private albums.

As a writer
Hamsalekha has written stories, screenplays and dialogues for several movies.

Story

 Avane Nanna Ganda (1989)
 Gandharva (1993)
 Shaapa (2001)

Screenplay

 Nimmajji (1989)
 Gandharva (1993)

Dialogues

 Premaloka (1987)
 Ranadheera (1988)
 Ranaranga  (1988)
 Avane Nanna Ganda (1989)
 Yuga Purusha (1989)
 Halli Meshtru (1992)
 Gandharva (1993)

Mentoring
Hamsalekha has mentored several notable singers, music directors, lyricist, directors in Kannada movie industry
 Rajesh Krishnan, Indian Playback Singer
 Chetan Sosca, Playback Singer
 Hemanth Kumar, Playback Singer
 K. Kalyan, Music composer and lyricist
 Nanditha, Playback Singer
 Anoop Seelin, Music Composer
 V. Harikrishna, Music composer
 V. Manohar, Music composer, lyricist and director
 V. Sridhar, Music composer

Desi Music Trust
Hamsalekha laid the foundation stone for Desi Music University on the day of Kannada Rajyotsava on 1 November 2010. The Dravidian University of Andhra Pradesh has given recognition to this Hamsalekha College of Performing Arts.

Awards
Hamsalekha has received many awards over the past three decades.

National Film Awards:
 1995 - National Film Award for Best Music Direction - Film: Sangeetha Sagara Ganayogi Panchakshara Gavai

Honorary doctorate:
He has been conferred the honorary doctorate award by the Bengaluru University in the year 2014 for his meritorious service to the Indian Music Industry.

Filmfare Awards South:
 2005 - Filmfare Award for Best Music Director (Kannada) - Film: Nenapirali
 2000 - Filmfare Award for Best Music Director (Kannada) - Film: Preethse
 1998 - Filmfare Award for Best Music Director (Kannada) - Film: Yaare Neenu Cheluve
 1994 - Filmfare Award for Best Music Director (Kannada) - Film: Halunda Tavaru
 1993 - Filmfare Award for Best Music Director (Kannada) - film: Aakasmika
 1991 - Filmfare Award for Best Music Director (Kannada) - Film: Ramachaari

Karnataka State Film Awards:
For music direction
 2005 -  Nenapirali
 1995 - Sangeetha Sagara Ganayogi Panchakshara Gavai
 1994 - Halunda Tavaru

For lyrics
2001 - Sri Manjunatha
1994 - Haalunda Thavaru

Other awards:
2012 - Dr. Rajkumar Lifetime Achievement Award from Karnataka State Government
2005 - Rajyostava Award (Suvarna Rajyostava)
2020 - S. Janaki National Award
2001 - Nandi Award - Sri Manjunatha
2004 - Hello Gandhinagara Award Best Music Director
2005 - Kempegowda Prashasti
2005 - Sunfeast Udaya film award for the best lyrics - Nenapirali

Discography

Telugu films
 2001: Sri Manjunatha
 1997: Omkaram
 1993: Ankuram
 1991: Shanti Kranti
 1990: Kaliyuga Abhimanyudu
 1990: Prema Yuddham
 1989: Muthyamantha Muddu
 1988: Avalu

Tamil films
 1991: Captain Magal
 1991: Nattukku Oru Nallavan
 1990: Velai Kidaichuduchu
 1989: Idhu Unga Kudumbam
 1988: Kodi Parakuthu
 1987: Paruva Ragam
 1988: Puthiya Vaanam

References

External links
 
 
Song composed by Hamsalekha

Living people
1951 births
Kannada film score composers
Kannada-language lyricists
Indian male playback singers
Indian male songwriters
Musicians from Mysore
Tamil film score composers
Telugu film score composers
Filmfare Awards South winners
Best Music Direction National Film Award winners
Film musicians from Karnataka
20th-century Indian composers
21st-century Indian composers
20th-century Indian dramatists and playwrights
Writers from Mysore
20th-century Indian male writers
Screenwriters from Karnataka
Recipients of the Rajyotsava Award 2006
Indian male film score composers
20th-century Indian male singers
20th-century Indian singers
21st-century Indian male singers
21st-century Indian singers